How It's Made (Comment c'est fait in French) is a Canadian documentary television series that premiered on January 6, 2001, on the Discovery Channel in Canada and the Science Channel in the United States. The program is produced in the Canadian province of Quebec by Productions MAJ, Inc. and Productions MAJ 2.

Format
The show is a documentary showing how common, everyday items (such as clothing and accessories, food, industrial products, musical instruments, and sporting goods) are manufactured. It also features the restoration processes of old items in some episodes.

How It's Made does not include explanatory texts to simplify dubbing in different languages. The show also avoids having an onscreen host (after Season 1 in the Canadian version) and an interview with employees explaining the process. Instead, an off-screen narrator explains the process, often with humorous puns.

Each episode features three or four products divided by segments, with each product getting a demonstration of approximately five minutes; exceptions are allowed in the allotted time for more complex ones. The scripts are almost identical across regional versions of the show; however, the main difference in the U.S. version is that the units of measurement are given in the United States customary units instead of metric units used in the Canadian version. At one point in the U.S. run, a subtitled conversion was shown on-screen over the original narration.

The "Historical Capsule" segment, which is available until Season 5, introduces historical background information for the last featured product in each episode, showing how and where the product originated, and what people used before it. It presents a series of single-line drawings which got colored for a brief amount of time after completed.

The "Techno flash" segment briefly introduces some novelty from industry or science development. It is only available in Season 1 and 2.

In April 2007, all episodes run in the United States (on the Discovery Channel and Science) had the individual season openings replaced with a new opening used for every episode. Similar to most other Discovery Channel shows, the credits now run during the last segment, with the show's website for request or feedback at the end.

Season 9, first aired in September 2007, features new opening graphic and segment's background music, both of which are different from the Canadian version. Zac Fine replaces Brooks T. Moore as the narrator. However, from Season 11, which premiered in September 2008, the show reinstates Moore as the narrator and uses the title sequence and background music to match with the Canadian version.

In June 2008, the Science Channel added How It's Made: Remix, which consists of previous segments arranged into theme installments like "Food", "Sporting Goods", and such. In 2013, it added How It's Made: Dream Cars, which focused exclusively on high-performance and exotic cars. These were later shown on the Velocity (now Motor Trend) channel.

Hosts
The show has different narrators for different regions.

In the Canadian version, it features Mark Tewksbury (Season 1, 2001) as the host of the show. Lynn Herzeg (Seasons 2–4, 2002–2005), June Wallack (Season 5, 2005) and Lynne Adams (Season 6 onwards, 2006–present) are the narrators.

In the U.S. version, Brooks Moore and Zac Fine (Season 9–10, 2007–2008) are the narrators.

In the United Kingdom, the rest of Europe, and in some cases in Southeast Asia, the series is narrated by Tony Hirst.

Episodes

Critical reception
Common Sense Media gave the TV show a rating of 4/5 stars, writing "Curious kids and adults will learn from the show, and some segments can really broaden your perspective". On the show's success despite its formulaic nature, Rita Mullin, the general manager of the Science Channel, said "I think what is one of the great appeals of the show as a viewer myself is how little has changed over the years". The Wall Street Journal deemed it "TV's quietest hit".

Accolades

Parodies
The show's style is spoofed in the Rick and Morty episode "Interdimensional Cable 2: Tempting Fate", showing how a "Plumbus" is being made.

Notes

References

External links

 
 

2001 Canadian television series debuts
2000s Canadian documentary television series
2010s Canadian documentary television series
Discovery Channel (Canada) original programming
Science Channel original programming
Documentary television series about industry
English-language television shows